Frank Henderson (December 6, 1922 – April 27, 2015) was a Republican Idaho State Representative from 2012 to 2014 representing District 3 in the B seat. He previously served in District 5 Seat B from 2004 to 2012. Henderson was the mayor of Post Falls, Idaho from 1980 to 1983 and Kootenai County commissioner from 1983 to 1991.

Early life and career 
Henderson graduated high school in Wisconsin and attended the University of Idaho. He was a soldier in the United States Army's 33rd Infantry Division during World War II.

Elections
2012

Redistricted to 3B, Henderson won the Republican primary with 55.6% of the vote against Jack Schroeder.

Henderson defeated Democratic nominee Ronald K. Johnson in the general election with 70.1% of the vote.

2010

Henderson was unopposed in the Republican primary and the general election.

2008

Henderson was unopposed in the Republican primary and the general election.

2006

Henderson was unopposed in the Republican primary.

Henderson again defeated Democratic nominee Lyndon Harriman, this time with 65.54% of the vote.

2004

Henderson challenged incumbent Republican Representative Charles Eberle in the Republican primary, winning with 51.57% of the vote.

Henderson won the general election with 69.5% of the vote against Democratic nominee Lyndon Harriman.

1992

Henderson lost the District 2 senate seat race to Democratic Representative Barbara Chamberlain in the general election on November 3, 1992. Chamberlain held the seat from 1992 until 1996.

1990

Henderson lost the District 2 senate B seat race to Dennis Davis in the general election on November 6, 1990. Davis won the District 3 senate seat in the 1992 election and served in the senate from 1990 until 1994.

Personal life 
Henderson died on April 27, 2015, in Coeur d'Alene, Idaho.

Henderson's grandson is Nick Henderson, a politician in Idaho who ran for Idaho's 1st congressional district Idaho Republican Party primary in May 2018. Nick took 6th place with 2% of the vote.

References

External links
 

1922 births
2015 deaths
United States Army personnel of World War II
County commissioners in Idaho
Mayors of places in Idaho
Republican Party members of the Idaho House of Representatives
People from Post Falls, Idaho
Politicians from Chicago
United States Army soldiers
University of Idaho alumni